Petru Ştirbate (born February 8, 1960) is a politician from Moldova. He has been a member of the Parliament of Moldova since 2010.

External links 
 Site-ul Parlamentului Republicii Moldova

References

1960 births
Living people
Liberal Democratic Party of Moldova MPs
Moldovan MPs 2010–2014